Mike Ryhal (born October 1, 1957) is an American politician. He is a former member of the South Carolina House of Representatives from the 56th District, serving from 2012 to 2018. He is a member of the Republican party.

References

Living people
1957 births
South Carolina Republicans
People from Sharon, Pennsylvania
21st-century American politicians